Jacques Santer (born 18 May 1937) is a Luxembourgish politician who served as the 9th President of the European Commission from 1995 to 1999. He served as Finance Minister of Luxembourg from 1979 until 1989, and the 20th Prime Minister of Luxembourg from 1984 to 1995, as a member of the Christian Social People's Party (CSV), which was the leading party in the Luxembourg government between 1979 and 2013. As Prime Minister of Luxembourg he also led the negotiations on the Single European Act, which effectively set aside the 20-year-old Luxembourg Compromise.

Career 
He graduated in 1959 from the Paris Institute of Political Studies, and received his doctorate in law in 1961. From 1972 to 1974 he was a junior minister in the government. From 1979 to 1984 he was Minister of Finance, Minister for Work and Minister for Social Security, under Pierre Werner, in the coalition government between the Christian Social People's Party (CSV) and the liberal Democratic Party.

After the general election of 1984, Pierre Werner retired as Prime Minister and from political life in general, and Santer became the new Prime Minister. He and the CSV now formed a new coalition with the Luxembourg Socialist Workers' Party (LSAP), which had come out of the elections as the second-largest party in the legislature, beating the Democratic Party into third place; the CSV remained the largest party. This CSV / LSAP coalition was to last until 1999.

On 10 November 1990 an article appeared in the newspaper vum Lëtzebuerger Vollek, which translates into "Five years of state secret – The bombing NATO terror commando" that caused a parliament inquiry in which Santer was forced to reveal the existence of a stay-behind army in Luxembourg and being politically responsible to call for its dissolution. The organisation was active since its creation by the then prime minister Pierre Werner in 1959 and was organised by the secret service of Luxembourg, the Service de Renseignement de l'Etat (SREL) and coordinated by the NATO. On 17 December 1990 he told the constitutional committee the organisation had never more than 12 members and was only foreseen to handle intelligence operations, as well as escape and evasion manoeuvers. There were weapons caches established in 1973, but direct access would not have been granted, according to Santer.  On 14 October 1990 the remaining members of the organisation were informed and requested to return their radio communication equipment.

Presidency of the European Commission 

Santer became the ninth President of the European Commission in 1995 as a compromise choice between the United Kingdom and a Franco-German alliance, after the Franco-German nominee Jean-Luc Dehaene was vetoed by British prime minister John Major. Santer's selection was barely ratified by a European Parliament upset with the process for which Commission presidents are selected.

In the same year, 1995, Santer became the first recipient of the Vision for Europe Award.

Allegations of corruption concerning individual EU-commissioners led to an investigation into administrative failings (incompetence and malpractice) by a so-called Committee of Independent Experts. Despite clearing most commissioners, the report stated that they had not found a single person showing the slightest sense of responsibility. Because the implicated commissioners refused to resign and the President of the European Commission did not have the power to dismiss individual commissioners, Santer and his entire commission resigned on 15 March 1999, the very day of the report's publication. As the Commission would only have lasted for half a year from then, he was replaced by Vice-President Manuel Marín on an interim basis.

Later career 

From 1999 until 2004, Santer was a member of the European Parliament. He also was on General Mediterranean Holdings' board, a financial holding owned by Anglo-Iraqi Nadhmi Auchi.

He is currently President of Group Europe, a member section of the Union of European Federalists. He also sits on the board of directors of RTL Group, an international TV broadcasting and production company.

On Monday 23 January 2012, Jacques Santer was appointed to head the board of the Special Purpose Investment Vehicle (SPIV), which is designed to boost the firepower of the European Financial Stability Facility, the eurozone rescue fund.

In May 2013, Santer became Honorary Member of SME Europe, the official pro-business organisation of the European People's Party.

Honours
  : Grand Cross of the Order of the Falcon (1990)
  : Grand Cordon of the Order of the Rising Sun (2015)
  : Grand Cross of the Order of the Oak Crown 
  : Grand Cross of the Order of Merit of the Grand Duchy of Luxembourg 
  : Golden Medal for Merit to Culture – Gloria Artis (2008)
  : Grand Cross of the Order of Prince Henry (1990)
  : Grand Cross of the Military Order of Christ (1988)
  : Grand Cross of the National Order of Faithful Service (2004)

See also
 List of prime ministers of Luxembourg
 Santer-Poos Ministry I
 Santer-Poos Ministry II
 Santer-Poos Ministry III
 Santer Commission

References

|-

|-

|-

Prime Ministers of Luxembourg
Ministers for Finances of Luxembourg
Presidents of the European Commission
Presidents of the European People's Party
Luxembourgian European Commissioners
Christian Social People's Party politicians
Luxembourgian jurists
1937 births
Living people
People from Mertert
Alumni of the Athénée de Luxembourg
Christian Social People's Party MEPs
MEPs for Luxembourg 1999–2004
Luxembourgian bankers
European Commissioners 1995–1999